Robert W. Funk (July 18, 1926 – September 3, 2005) was an American biblical scholar, founder of the Jesus Seminar and the nonprofit Westar Institute in Santa Rosa, California. Funk sought to promote research and education on what he called biblical literacy. His approach to hermeneutics was historical-critical, with a strongly skeptical view of orthodox Christian belief, particularly concerning the historical Jesus. He and his associates described Jesus' parables as containing shocking messages that contradicted established religious attitudes.

Career
Funk had a Bachelor of Divinity and Master's degree from Butler University and its affiliated Christian Theological Seminary in 1950 and 1951, a PhD in 1953 from Vanderbilt University and was a Guggenheim Fellow and a Senior Fulbright Scholar.

He taught at the American School of Oriental Research in Jerusalem, was chairman of the graduate department of religion at Vanderbilt University and executive secretary of the Society of Biblical Literature. He was founder and first executive director of Scholars Press (1974–1980).

Works

Books
 - translator and revisor

As editor

Articles and chapters

References

External links
 Obituary in the Los Angeles Times 7 September 2005
 Robert Funk page at the Westar Institute
 Obituary in Boston Globe

1926 births
2005 deaths
20th-century American writers
21st-century American writers
20th-century biblical scholars
21st-century biblical scholars
American biblical scholars
American Christian theologians
Butler University alumni
Deaths from respiratory failure
Grammarians of Ancient Greek
New Testament scholars
People from Santa Rosa, California
Vanderbilt University alumni
Hermeneutists
Place of birth missing
Members of the Jesus Seminar
Religious naturalists
Fulbright alumni